Arnocrinum is a genus of herbs in the family Asphodelaceae, first described as a genus in 1846. The entire genus is endemic to the State of Western Australia.

Species
 Arnocrinum drummondii Endl. & Lehm. in J.G.C.Lehmann, Pl. Preiss. 2: 41 (1846)
 Arnocrinum gracillimum Keighery, Fl. Australia 45: 466 (1987)
 Arnocrinum preisii Lehm., Pl. Preiss. 2: 42 (1846)

References

Asphodelaceae genera
Hemerocallidoideae
Endemic flora of Australia
Taxa described in 1846
Taxa named by Stephan Endlicher
Taxa named by Johann Georg Christian Lehmann